October 10 - Eastern Orthodox liturgical calendar - October 12

All fixed commemorations below celebrated on October 24 by Orthodox Churches on the Old Calendar.

For October 11th, Orthodox Churches on the Old Calendar commemorate the Saints listed on September 28.

Saints
 Holy Apostle Philip of the Seventy Disciples, one of the seven deacons (1st century)
 Martyrs Zenaida (Zenais) and Philonilla, of Tarsus in Cilicia (1st century)
 Saints Nectarius (397), Arsacius (405) and Sinisius (427), Archbishops of Constantinople and Ecumenical Patriarchs.
 Venerable Theophanes Graptus ("the Branded"), Confessor and Hymnographer, Bishop of Nicaea (850)

Pre-Schism Western saints
 Saint Germanus of Besançon, Bishop of Besançon (c. 390)
 Saint Placidia, a holy virgin venerated in Verona in Italy (c. 460)
 Saint Gratus of Oloron, first Bishop of Oloron in the south of France (c. 506)
 Saint Firminus of Uzès, born in Narbonne in the south of France, he became Bishop of Uzès (553)
 Saint Cainnech of Aghaboe (Canice, Kenneth, Kenny), Abbot, of Aghaboe in Ireland, and missionary in Scotland (600)
 Venerable Æthelburh of Barking (Ethelburga), foundress of Barking Abbey, England (c. 676)
 Saint Agilbert (Aglibert), Bishop of Paris (c. 685)
 Saint Emilian, according to tradition a hermit in Rennes in Brittany.
 Saint Eufridus, a monk near Asti in Italy, whose relics were venerated in the Cathedral of Alba in Piedmont (7th century)
 Saint Ansilio, a monk whose relics were enshrined at the monastery of Lagny in the north of France (late 7th century)
 Saint Juliana of Pavilly, A servant girl who became a nun and then abbess at Pavilly  in France (c. 750)
 Saint Gummarus (Gomer), Belgian hermit, patron of Lier, Belgium (c. 774)
 Saint Bruno the Great, Bishop of Cologne in Germany (965)

Post-Schism Orthodox saints
 Saints Theophanes, Soleas and Jonah of Pergamos, Cyprus (12th century)
 Saint Theophanes, faster, of the Kiev Caves (12th century)
 Venerable Germanos "Maroulis" the Hagiorite (1336)
 Venerable Philotheus Kokkinos of Mount Athos, Patriarch of Constantinople (1379)

New Martys and Confessors
 New Hieromartyr Philaret Velikanov and Alexander Grivsky, Priests (1918)
 New Hieromartyr Juvenalius (Maslovsky), Bishop of Riazan (1937)

Other commemorations
 Commemoration of the Miracle from the Icon of Our Lord Jesus Christ in Beirut of Phoenicia (7th century)
 Commemoration of the Holy Fathers of the Seventh Ecumenical Council.  ( On the Sunday between October 11 and 17 ) 
 Synaxis of the Saints of Kios.  (On the Sunday between October 11–17)
 Synaxis of the Elders of Optina:
 Leonid of Optina (1841)
 Macarius (1860)
 Moses (1862)
 Anthony (1865)
 Hilarion (1873)
 Ambrose (1891)
 Anatole I the "Elder" (1894)
 Isaac I (1894)
 Joseph (1911)
 Barsanuphius (1913)
 Anatole II the "Younger" (1922)
 Nektary (1928)
 New Hieroconfessor Nikon (1931)
 New Hieromartyr Archimandrite Isaac II (1938)

Icon gallery

Notes

References

Sources 
 October 11/24. Orthodox Calendar (PRAVOSLAVIE.RU).
 October 24 / October 11. HOLY TRINITY RUSSIAN ORTHODOX CHURCH (A parish of the Patriarchate of Moscow).
 October 11. OCA - The Lives of the Saints.
 The Autonomous Orthodox Metropolia of Western Europe and the Americas (ROCOR). St. Hilarion Calendar of Saints for the year of our Lord 2004. St. Hilarion Press (Austin, TX). pp. 75–76.
 The Eleventh Day of the Month of October. Orthodoxy in China.
 October 11. Latin Saints of the Orthodox Patriarchate of Rome.
 The Roman Martyrology. Transl. by the Archbishop of Baltimore. Last Edition, According to the Copy Printed at Rome in 1914. Revised Edition, with the Imprimatur of His Eminence Cardinal Gibbons. Baltimore: John Murphy Company, 1916. pp. 314–315.
 Rev. Richard Stanton. A Menology of England and Wales, or, Brief Memorials of the Ancient British and English Saints Arranged According to the Calendar, Together with the Martyrs of the 16th and 17th Centuries. London: Burns & Oates, 1892. pp. 485–486.
Greek Sources
 Great Synaxaristes:  11 ΟΚΤΩΒΡΙΟΥ. ΜΕΓΑΣ ΣΥΝΑΞΑΡΙΣΤΗΣ.
  Συναξαριστής. 11 Οκτωβρίου. ECCLESIA.GR. (H ΕΚΚΛΗΣΙΑ ΤΗΣ ΕΛΛΑΔΟΣ).
  11/10/2017. Ορθόδοξος Συναξαριστής. 
Russian Sources
  24 октября (11 октября). Православная Энциклопедия под редакцией Патриарха Московского и всея Руси Кирилла (электронная версия). (Orthodox Encyclopedia - Pravenc.ru).
  11 октября по старому стилю / 24 октября по новому стилю. Русская Православная Церковь - Православный церковный календарь на 2016 год.

October in the Eastern Orthodox calendar